Mentha arvensis, the corn mint, field mint, or wild mint, is a species of flowering plant in the mint family Lamiaceae. It has a circumboreal distribution, being native to the temperate regions of Europe and western and central Asia, east to the Himalaya and eastern Siberia, and North America. Mentha canadensis, the related species, is also included in Mentha arvensis by some authors as two varieties, M. arvensis var. glabrata Fernald (North American plants such as American Wild Mint) and M. arvensis var. piperascens  Malinv. ex L. H. Bailey (eastern Asian plants such as Japanese mint).

It grows in moist places, especially along streams.

Description
It has a creeping rootstock from which grow erect or semi-sprawling squarish stems.

The flowers are pale purple (occasionally white or pink), in whorls on the stem at the bases of the leaves. The fruit is a two-chambered carpel.

Subspecies
Subspecies include:
Mentha arvensis subsp. arvensis.
Mentha arvensis subsp. agrestis (Sole) Briq. 
Mentha arvensis subsp. austriaca (Jacq.) Briq. 
Mentha arvensis subsp. lapponica (Wahlenb.) Neuman 
Mentha arvensis subsp. palustris (Moench) Neumann 
Mentha arvensis var. piperascenes Malinv. ex L. H. Bailey - Japanese/Chinese/Korean mint
Mentha arvensis subsp. parietariifolia (Becker) Briq.
Mentha arvensis subsp. haplocalyx (Linnaeus, e.g. var. sachalinensis)

The related species Mentha canadensis is also included in M. arvensis by some authors as two varieties, M. arvensis var. glabrata Fernald (in reference to North American plants) and M. arvensis var. piperascens Malinv. ex L. H. Bailey (in reference to eastern Asian plants).

Uses
The leaves have been made into tea to treat colds or aid digestion. They can also be eaten raw.

Chemical substances that can be extracted from wild mint include menthol, menthone, isomenthone, neomenthol, limonene, methyl acetate, piperitone, beta-caryophyllene, alpha-pinene, beta-pinene, tannins and flavonoids. Mint extracts and menthol-related chemicals are used in food, drinks, cough medicines, creams and cigarettes.  Menthol is widely used in dental care, as a mouthwash potentially inhibiting streptococci and lactobacilli bacteria.

Diseases 
Two main diseases that can significantly damage Japanese mint (M. arvensis var. piperascens) and its yield are the rust fungus and the mildew attacks. Mildew attacks usually only occur on the west coast of United States where the weather can be foggy and humid, a condition that attracts mildew. Rust fungus is a disease that is common for most of the Mentha plants such as peppermint and spearmint. These diseases are flagged due to the almost to none probability of controlling once it starts in a mint farm. They are typically cut immediately when discovered to help reduce the probability of contaminating the rest of the plant leaves.

References

External links

 Jepson Manual Treatment
 Photo gallery

arvensis
Flora of Asia
Flora of Europe
Flora of North America
Leaf vegetables
Plants described in 1753
Taxa named by Carl Linnaeus